The percent of Australian states covered in closed-canopy forest. Adding open woodland, these figures may be much higher.

States

Western Australia: ~16%
South Australia: ~9%
Victoria: ~16%
New South Wales: ~15%
Queensland: ~39%
Tasmania: ~65%
Northern Territory: ~18%

See also

Forest cover by state, U.S.
Forest Cover By Province, Canada
Forest cover by state in India
Forest cover by federal subject in Russia

Cover
Forestry-related lists